Uppland is a historical province or  on the eastern coast of Sweden, just north of Stockholm, the capital. It borders Södermanland, Västmanland and Gästrikland. It is also bounded by lake Mälaren and the Baltic Sea. On the small uninhabited island of Märket in the Baltic, Uppland has a very short and unusually shaped land border with Åland, an autonomous province of Finland.

The name literally means up land, a name which is commonly encountered in especially older English literature as Upland. Its Latinised form, which is occasionally used, is Uplandia. Uppland is famous for having the highest concentration of runestones in the world, with as many as 1,196 inscriptions in stone left by the Vikings.

Administration 
The traditional provinces of Sweden serve no administrative or political purposes, but are historical and cultural entities. The bulk of the population, however, is within Stockholm County. Minor parts of the province are also in Västmanland, Gävleborg and Södermanland Counties.

Heraldry 
Historically, Uppland ranked as a duchy and the coat of arms is represented with a ducal coronet, blazoned thus: "Gules, a Royal Orb Or gemmed of the field and Azure with the cross bottoned Argent." Despite the fact that the Uppsala County has a different name and a smaller territory, it was granted the same coat of arms in 1940.

Geography 
Uppland was historically divided into chartered cities and districts. Within Roslagen they were called  (which roughly means "ship district"), and in the rest of the province hundreds. The abovementioned districts and cities have no administrative function today.

Cities
Djursholm (1913)
Enköping (approximately 1300)
Lidingö (1926)
Norrtälje (1622)
Sigtuna (approximately 990)
Solna (1943)
Stockholm (1252)
Sundbyberg (1927)
Uppsala (1286)
Vaxholm (1652)
Öregrund (1491)
Östhammar (approximately 1300)

Districts

Facts
Highest mountain: Upplandsberget at Siggeforasjön, 117 metres
Most Runestones: as many as 1,196 inscriptions in stone
Largest lake: Mälaren
Archipelago: Roslagen
National Parks: Ängsö, Färnebofjärden

Population 
The population of Uppland was 1,602,652 as of 31 December 2016. The provincial population corresponds to the different overlapping counties as follows:

History 

Uppland is the birthplace of Bridget of Sweden (1303 – 23 July 1373).

The earliest unambiguous mention of the province of Uppland comes from the 1296, when it was mentioned that it included the Folklands of Fjärdhundraland, Attundaland, Tiundaland and Roslagen. The Swedish capital of Stockholm is divided between two provinces. The southern half lies in Södermanland and the northern half in Uppland.

Dukes and duchess 

Prince Waldemar (1310-1318 – also Öland)
Princess Ingiburga, his wife (1312-1318 – also Öland)
 Prince Gustav (1827–1852)
 Prince Sigvard (1907-1934)

Religion 
Uppsala is the seat of the only archbishop of the Lutheran Church of Sweden. Before the Protestant Reformation, the archdiocese and archbishop were within the Roman Catholic Church.

Culture 
The archaeological site Birka and the castle of Drottningholm are UNESCO World Heritage Sites.

Sports
Football in the province is administered by Upplands Fotbollförbund. Bandy is also popular, with IK Sirius.

References

External links 
Uppland - Tourist site
Uppland - Tourist information

 
Provinces of Sweden